Kuznetsky Most is a street in central Moscow, that runs from Bolshaya Dmitrovka Street to Lubyanka Street. The name, literally Blacksmith's Bridge, refers to the 18th-century bridge over the (now underground) Neglinnaya River, and a nearby foundry and the settlement of its workers. Since the middle of the 18th century, Kuznetsky Most has been a fashionable shopping street.

The street is administered by Tverskoy District (west) and Meshchansky District (east).

History

Early history

Until the end of 15th century, Moscow was growing eastward, into Kitai-gorod. Prince Ivan III of Russia established his arsenal (Пушечный двор, Cannon Court) in the west, beyond the Neglinnaya river. Later, he also set up a settlement of former Pskov residents, abducted from their hometown after the wars of the 1480s. Population grew slowly until the 1737 fire which razed the area.

The Bridge
Soon after the fire, the territory was built out with upper-class buildings and shops. Large territories north from the street were consolidated by the Vorontsov family estate. In 1754-57, architect Semyon Yakovlev built a stone bridge over Neglinnaya River to a design by Dmitry Ukhtomsky. The bridge over Neglinnaya lowlands extended 120 meters long and 12 meters wide; the shops between Kuznetsky Bridge and Vorontsov lands were literally standing on the edge of this bridge. The street was known as the home of notorious Darya Saltykova (1730-1801), condemned to life in prison for torturing her slaves.

19th century

The Fire of Moscow (1812) spared Kuznetsky Most, where Napoleon's Guards were stationed in defense of the French colony in Moscow. In 1817-1819, the city locked the Neglinnaya River in a tunnel and demolished the redundant bridge - excluding its northern wall that supported surviving buildings. Soon, the French colony returned and Kuznetsky Bridge became the street of bookstores, fashion and upper-class shopping, mostly managed by the French. Kuznetsky Most became the symbol of French influence on Russians, immortalized in Woe from Wit by Alexandr Griboyedov.

After Emancipation reform of 1861, Kuznetsky Most became the financial center of Moscow, with historical Juncker Bank Building and Dzhamgarov Bank built in the 1890s. Art Nouveau landmark by Ivan Mashkov, the Sokol building (3, Kuznetsky Most) was built in 1903-1904. However, at that time its address was Kuznetsky Lane: the part of Kuznetsky Most west of Petrovka Street was then known as Kuznetsky Lane; two streets were merged only in 1922.

Modern history

In the 1920s, the Bolshevik administration demolished the church on the corner of Kuznetsky Most and Lubyanka Street, creating Vorovsky Square. Nearby blocks were gradually converted to KGB offices after World War II; the blocks facing Lubyanka Square were torn down to make way for the Ministry of the Maritime Fleet and Alexey Dushkin's Detsky Mir department store. The latter was restored in 2014 and now hosts the world's largest mechanical clock, "Raketa Monumental". Since the 1980s, the street has regained its status as an upper-class shopping lane, notably with the rebuilding of Roman Klein's historical TsUM store. Among cultural institutions located on the street are the Moscow Operetta Theater, Kuznetsky Most Exhibition Hall, as well as two major state libraries.

Rapid transit 
Kuznetsky Most, Lubyanka and Okhotny Ryad stations of the Moscow Metro are located nearby.

Gallery

References

 Russian: П.В.Сытин, "Из истории московских улиц", М, 1948 (Sytin)

Shopping districts and streets in Russia
Streets in Moscow
Tourist attractions in Moscow